Boliden AB is a Swedish multinational metals, mining, and smelting company headquartered in Stockholm. The company produces zinc, copper, lead, nickel, silver, and gold, with operations in Sweden, Finland, Norway, and Ireland.

Boliden is linked to a major environmental disaster in Spain and is also accused of threatening human rights defenders following the disposal of toxic waste in Chile.

In 2003, in a major deal, Boliden acquired Outokumpu's mining and smelting assets within zinc and copper. The company name comes from the Boliden mine, some 30 km northwest of the Swedish town of Skellefteå, where gold was found in 1924. It was once Europe's largest and richest gold mine, but has since 1967 been defunct.

In 2020, Boliden Mineral AB became the first company in Sweden to issue a Strategic Lawsuit Against Public Participation. UN Human Rights experts from OHCHR (Office of the High Commissioner on Human Rights at the United Nations) wrote to the managing director of Boliden to convey concerns of alleged ongoing breaches of human rights, including ‘intimidation and threat [against] human rights defenders’.

In August 2021, Boliden joined up with several of the world's other major mining companies and Komatsu to advance zero-emission mining.

In August 2021, Boliden ranked second among mining companies in Bloomberg Intelligence's low-carbon ranking. In 2017 already, Boliden was rated the world's second most climate-friendly mining firm with regards to carbon dioxide.

Mines
Business Area Mines conducts exploration, mining and milling operations in Sweden, Finland, and Ireland. Its main products are zinc and copper concentrate, with some lead, gold and silver content. The goods produced are sold both to the Group's own smelters and to external customers. Boliden owns and operates Europe's biggest zinc mine at Tara in Ireland. Tara became part of Boliden in early 2004, but production began there in 1977, since when over 60 million tonnes of ore have been mined. Boliden also owns Garpenberg, which is Sweden's oldest mine still in operation. Mining at Garpenberg, or extracting metals from the ground, began as early as 375 bc. The mineral-rich Skellefte field lies within the Boliden Area, where almost 30 mines have been opened since production began in the 1920s and where Boliden currently operates the Renström and Kristineberg underground mines and the Maurliden open pit mine. Boliden also owns and operates the Aitik open pit mine, which is one of Europe's biggest copper mines. Metal grades at Aitik are low, but this is compensated for by high productivity levels and efficient milling processes that also exploit the ore's gold and silver content. An expansion project that will double Aitik's ore production to 36 million tonnes per annum by 2014 began in 2007 and will be completed in 2010.

Smelters
Business Area Smelters refines both metal concentrate and secondary materials to produce base and precious metals at smelters in Sweden, Finland and Norway. The main metals are zinc and copper but the production of lead, gold and silver also makes a substantial contribution to the Business Area's revenues. Other products include sulphuric acid and aluminium fluoride. Boliden owns and operates two zinc and two copper smelters and one lead smelter. The Kokkola zinc smelter in Finland is the second largest in Europe and the fifth largest in the world, and mainly produces an alloy used in the galvanising of thin sheet metal. The Odda zinc smelter, which produces zinc for the steel industry and aluminium fluoride for Norway's aluminium industry, is located on the west coast of Norway. The Rönnskär copper smelter is located in the Swedish town of Skelleftehamn and its main products are copper, zinc clinker, lead and precious metals. The smelter, which produces sulphuric acid as a by-product of its operations, also produces metals from electronic scrap and other secondary materials. The Harjavalta copper smelter, located on the west coast of Finland, produces copper cathodes that are mainly sold to manufacturers of semi-finished goods. Other important products include gold, silver and sulphuric acid. The Bergsöe lead smelter outside Landskrona in southern Sweden extracts lead from scrap car batteries. Bergsöe is one of Europe's four biggest players in the lead recycling industry. Approximately 60 per cent of the plant's lead production is sold to the European battery industry, with the remainder used in the manufacture of roofing sheet.

History
On 10 December 1924, a sensational ore deposit was discovered at Fågelmyran, just over 30 km northwest of Skellefteå. Test drilling revealed what was then Europe's richest ore. The first Boliden ore was extracted in the spring of 1926 at what would become the Boliden mine – a mine that would prove, over the course of several decades, to be Europe's biggest and richest gold mine. The deposit also included copper and large amounts of silver. The town of Boliden quickly grew up around the mine.
The leading light in the development of the Boliden company was Oscar Falkman (1877–1961), who was the driving force behind the exploration work that began in the second decade of the 20th century, and which was accelerated due to the metal shortage that arose in the wake of World War I. Falkman continued in the role of Boliden's President until 1941. Boliden AB was also part of the financier Ivar Kreuger's business empire until 1932.
The Rönnskär smelter was built to process the Boliden ore, and commenced smelting operations in 1930.
The world's longest ore tramway, between Boliden's mine in Kristineberg and Boliden became operational in 1943. The ore tramway was 96 km long and by the time it was shut down, 44 years later, it had transported 12 million tonnes of concentrate.
Operations started at the Aitik mine, outside Gällivare, in 1968. This open pit mine would develop, over the years, into one of Europe's biggest copper mines. During its first year of operations, it produced approximately 9,000 tonnes of copper, 160 kg of gold and 7 tonnes of silver.

The company grew during the first few years of the 1970s thanks to a joint venture with the German company, Preussag. This led to the expansion of Boliden's lead smelting and refining capacity, and in 1976, Boliden launched a Kaldo type furnace, for processing metals. 1976 also saw Boliden launch the first flash smelting furnace for lead, applying Kaldo technology, at Rönnskär.

In the mid-1980s, Boliden exported a total of 19,139 tonnes of metallic residues containing high concentrations of arsenic, mercury, cadmium and lead, from the Rönnskär smelter to a Chilean company, Promel, for processing. Boliden paid Promel for processing work that was never carried out and the residues were, instead, stored on the outskirts of the city of Arica at a site which was converted to a low-cost residential area in the 1990s on the instructions of the social services. The original export documents had specified that the metallic residues were 'non-toxic'  and residents were unaware of the waste's presence or potential for harm. As a result, many people came to harm. In the autumn of 2009, the Chilean government announced that the 7,000 or so residents of the area would be evacuated. The waste was exported before the Basel Convention prohibiting the export of environmentally hazardous waste came into force.

At the end of 1986, the Trelleborg industrial conglomerate acquired a controlling interest in Boliden. The same year also saw Boliden acquire the Spanish company, Apirsa S.L., which extracted zinc from the Aznalcóllar open pit mine, 45 km west of Seville.
Trelleborg launched a major restructuring of the Boliden Group in 1996, and the new company, Boliden Limited, was formed in Toronto. Two years later, Boliden Ltd. bought the Canadian company Westmin.

On 25 April 1998, the tailings dam at Apirsa's Los Frailes mine burst and 4.5 million cubic metres of tailings sand drained out into the nearby Guadiamar river, near Doñana National Park, causing the worst environmental disaster in Spain so far. Extensive investigations revealed defects in both the dam's original construction and in subsequent construction projects. The company reacted quickly to the situation and immediately began a comprehensive programme of reclamation work. In 2006, Boliden lost the demand against the companies that built the dam Aznalcóllar. The Spanish Supreme Court also confirmed that Boliden should pay 43,7 million euros to the Spanish government. The recovery costs of Aznalcóllar are estimated to be 240 million euro; Boliden has not assumed any part of these costs.

In 1999, Boliden implemented a restructuring programme at Group level and the Boliden share was listed on the Stockholm stock exchange.

In 2001, Boliden's head office was relocated back to Sweden.

In late 2003, Boliden bought smelters and a mine from the Finnish steel group, Outokumpu, and as a result, the Kokkola and Harjavalta/Pori smelters in Finland and the Odda smelter in Norway became part of Boliden. The purchase also included the Tara zinc mine in Ireland.

In 2020, Boliden Mineral AB became the first company in Sweden to issue a Strategic Lawsuit Against Public Participation.

History in brief

2021
Boliden was ranked no. 18 out of 120 oil, gas, and mining companies involved in resource extraction north of the Arctic Circle in the Arctic Environmental Responsibility Index (AERI).

2020
On 2 September, Boliden Mineral AB, represented by the law firm Mannheimer Swartling Advokatbyrå AB, filed a complaint to the Disciplinary Committee of the Swedish Bar Association against lawyers Mr Johan Öberg and Mr Göran Starkebo. The complaint, seeking to make them personally liable for costs incurred by Boliden in defending the ARICA case  was considered by the United Nations to be a threat equivalent to the first SLAPP  (Strategic Lawsuit Against Public Participation) in Swedish history.

2016
Boliden was ranked as being among the 13th best of 92 oil, gas, and mining companies on indigenous rights in the Arctic.

2013
796 residents of Arica brought a legal case against Boliden in the Swedish courts

2006
Decision to invest in an expansion of the Aitik mine. Agreement with OM Group Inc (OMG) regarding the refining of nickel concentrate at Harjavalta. Successful exploration resulted in increases to Garpenberg's ore reserves. A new lead section was also opened at Bergsöe.

2005
Kvarnberget is the name given to a new mineralisation discovered in Garpenberg. Decision to invest in expansion of the Harjavalta smelter. Feasibility study of possible expansion of the Aitik mine. Boliden sells its shares in Breakwater Resources and Lundin Mining. First edition of Boliden's in-house magazine, "Boliden Magazine", published.

2000
Harjavalta's nickel operations are sold. Maurliden mine  opens. The new Rönnskär complex is inaugurated.

1998
The Spanish Los Frailes mine closes as a result of the tailings dam failure, causing extensive damage in the environment, near Doñana National Park. The Rönnskär +200 expansion – an investment of SEK 1.9 billion – is approved.

1997
Boliden establishes its head office in Toronto. The share is listed on the Toronto and Montreal stock exchanges.

1995
Harjavalta is expanded, increasing copper and nickel production.

1990
The concentrator at Boliden is expanded and modernised. The Outokumpu Group is incorporated, and the zinc smelter becomes known as Outokumpu Zinc Oy and the copper and nickel smelters as Outokumpu Harjavalta Metals Oy.

1988
The Spanish mining company, Apirsa SL, becomes a subsidiary of Boliden.

1987
The Swedish industrial conglomerate, Trelleborg AB, takes a controlling interest in Boliden.

1985
Boliden ceased shipping toxic waste to northern Chile.

1984
Boliden began shipping 19,139 tonnes of toxic waste, containing high concentrations of arsenic, mercury and lead, from its smelter in Sweden, to Arica in northern Chile.

1979
Boliden buys Paul Bergsöe & Son.

1977
Production starts at the Irish zinc mine, Tara.

1970
Production of aluminium fluoride begins at Odda. In Ireland, Tara discovers the big zinc and lead deposit.

1969
Operations begin at the zinc smelter in Kokkola.

1968
Mining operations start at Aitik.

1967
The Boliden mine is closed down. Outokumpu decides to establish its own zinc smelter in Kokkola.

1957
Boliden acquires the Garpenberg mine from Zinkgruvor AB.

1955
The world's deepest railway – between the Långsele and Boliden mines – is completed.

1952
Construction of a sulphuric acid plant at Rönnskär to exploit the sulphur dioxide-bearing chimney gases.

1946
Boliden publishes Sweden's first in-house magazine, "Smältdegeln" [The Melting Pot].

1945
Copper production starts at Harjavalta.

1943
The 96-kilometre ore tramway between Kristineberg and Boliden opens. Tin and lead smelting starts at Bergsöe.

1942
Lead plant built at Rönnskär. Paul Bergsöe & Son AB formed in Landskrona.

1940
Operations start at the Kristineberg mine.

1939
Outokumpu Oy starts extracting zinc concentrate from Outokumpu ore.

1931
The two mining companies – Västerbottens Gruvaktiebolag and Skellefteås Gruvaktiebolag – are merged to form Bolidens Gruvaktiebolag.

1930
Operations start at the Rönnskär smelter.

1929
Zinc production begins at Odda.

1925
Västerbottens Gruvaktiebolag and Skellefteå Gruvaktiebolag are formed.

1924
Gold discovered at Fågelmyran in Boliden.

Dumping in Chile
In the mid-1980s, Boliden was involved in a dumping controversy in Chile. According to Business & Human Rights Resource Centre, "Boliden shipped approximately 20,000 tonnes of smelter sludge to the Polygono area in Arica between 1984 and 1985. The waste derived from Boliden's Rönnskär arsenic plant in Sweden and was sold to a Chilean company, Promel, for processing. However, the waste was reportedly left unprocessed and unprotected at the site until 1998. Starting in 1989, housing developments were built nearby, but Chilean authorities concluded in 2009 that the area should be evacuated as it remained contaminated."

The Boliden controversy in Chile stirred debate in the Swedish news in 2013, after 700 Chilean victims suffering from arsenic poisoning filed a lawsuit against Boliden.

In March 2021, Beatriz Balbin, Chief of the Special Procedures Branch of OHCHR (Office of the High Commissioner on Human Rights at the United Nations) wrote to the managing director of Boliden to convey alleged ongoing breaches of human rights, including ‘intimidation and threat [against] human rights defenders’.

Letters relating to the case, which dates back to Boliden’s export of 19,139 tonnes of toxic waste containing high concentrations of arsenic, mercury, cadmium and lead from Sweden to Chile between 1984 and 1985.

June 2021, a feature documentary film ARICA was released in Swedish cinemas

The Boliden toxic waste scandal was discussed in Swedish parliament where the Minister of Environment, Per Bolund (Green Party) indicated his willingness to discuss assistance to Chile to clean up the affected areas in Arica, saying:

“We have … much sanitation work of our own, on which we are spending lots of resources.

That means that we are developing techniques and solutions and we are of course willing to assist Chile if such aid is asked for.

We have had no such request from Chile.”

Video
The quote was immediately referred to in Chilean media and followed by a demand from a senate majority to the president to address Sweden with a request, as Per Bolund had asked for.

Senado exige al Gobierno repatriar residuos tóxicos a Suecia | Crónica

The then Chilean Minister of Foreign Affairs, Andres Allamand, announced in public that Sweden would be contacted in the matter.

Chile pedirá al gobierno sueco repatriar desechos tóxicos de basural industrial en Arica (6m13s into the reportage)

On July 4, 2021 SVT screened the documentary ARICA. Two Swedish Green Party MP’s, Maria Gardfjell, vice chair in the parliament’s environmental and agricultural committee, and Amanda Palmstierna, member of the parliament’s EU-committee, made a statement confirming the comments made in June by the Minister of Environment Per Bolund.

Giftskandalen i Arica är hänsynslös

Arica - en svensk giftskandal

See also the Doñana disaster, caused by negligence on the part of Boliden-Apirsa.

In media and popular culture 
The Aitik copper mine (a major mine within the company) was featured on a 2007 episode of the Discovery Channel series Really Big Things.

Released in 2014, Swedish director Roy Andersson's film A Pigeon Sat on a Branch Reflecting on Existence includes a controversial scene which, according to the director, refers to Boliden's involvement in dumping dangerous toxins in the Chilean city Arica in the 1980s. In a review of the film, film critic Jessica Kiang describes the scene: "And in probably the most unsettling and memorable scene, which plays out like a live action Monty Python animation, colonial-era British soldiers pack a huge brass drum outfitted with trumpet horns of varying sizes with chained black slaves. The door is closed, and a fire is lit beneath the drum, which begins to revolve slowly (it is emblazoned with the name of Swedish mining giant Boliden) and to emit a kind of music. All this, it is revealed, is being enacted for the entertainment of a group of elderly rich, champagne-sipping white people in evening wear."

The smelting victims in Arica is also the topic of Toxic Playground, a Swedish documentary by William Johansson and Lars Edman released in 2009.

In 2021, the topical satirical show Svenska Nyheter (Swedish News) included a 12 minute segment about the ARICA case, with a resident of Arica gathering a sample of contaminated soil, putting it in an envelope and mailing it back to Boliden.

Carbon footprint
Boliden reported Total CO2e emissions (Direct + Indirect) for 31 December 2020 at 897 Kt (-20 /-2.2% y-o-y). There has been a consistent declining trend in reported emissions since 2016.

See also

List of Swedish companies
Doñana disaster, caused by negligence on the part of Boliden-Apirsa.

References

External links

Mining technology description

Mining companies of Sweden
Copper mining companies of Sweden
Zinc mining companies
Gold mining companies of Sweden
Companies based in Stockholm
Non-renewable resource companies established in 1931
1931 establishments in Sweden
Companies listed on Nasdaq Stockholm